The Women's super-G competition at the FIS Alpine World Ski Championships 2019 was held on 5 February, and was the first event of the championships.

Results
The race was started at 12:30.

References

Women's super-G